Bob Kurtz is a retired American sportscaster, most recently broadcasting games for the Minnesota Wild hockey team. He has previously been a play-by-play announcer for the Boston Red Sox, Minnesota Twins, Minnesota North Stars, Minnesota Golden Gophers, and Michigan State Spartans.

Kurtz's broadcasting career began at his alma mater Michigan State University, where he called Spartans hockey, football, baseball and basketball from 1974 to 1979. In 1979 he joined KMSP-TV, where he called Minnesota Twins games from 1979–1986 and Minnesota North Stars games from 1979–1984. He was also the North Stars play by play announcer on KXLI-TV during the 1987–88 NHL season. From 1988–1989, he was the sports director at KSTP radio, where he also called University of Minnesota hockey, football and basketball.

Kurtz spent 11 years at the New England Sports Network. He was the network's studio host for Red Sox games from 1989–1992 before becoming the play-by-play announcer, replacing the legendary Ned Martin. He also did by play-by-play for the Paw Sox.  He remained with NESN until joining the Minnesota Wild in 2000. While at NESN, he also called Boston Bruins hockey, Boston University Terriers hockey, the Hockey East Game of the Week and the American Hockey League.

Kurtz returned to Minnesota in 2000 when he was hired to become the first radio play by play announcer for the Minnesota Wild. He was reunited with Tom Reid, who he previously worked with while calling games for the North Stars as well as University of Minnesota and Michigan State hockey broadcasts.

When the Twins' first PA announcer, Bob Casey, died before the start of the 2005, Kurtz was appointed interim PA announcer for the 2005 season. Wild PA announcer Adam Abrams replaced Kurtz as PA announcer for the 2006 season.

Kurtz returned to broadcasting for the Twins in 2011 as a part-time radio play-by-play announcer to go along with his work with the Wild.

The 74 year-old Kurtz reduced his broadcasting role to 22 Wild home games for the 2021-2022 season. 

Kurtz retired after calling his last game on January 14, 2022. He spent nearly 22 seasons with the Wild.

The Minnesota Wild honored Kurtz on February 11, 2023 at Xcel Energy Center, before a game with the New Jersey Devils.

References 

Living people
American Hockey League broadcasters
American radio sports announcers
American television sports announcers
Boston Bruins announcers
Boston Red Sox announcers
College baseball announcers in the United States
College basketball announcers in the United States
College football announcers
College hockey announcers in the United States
Major Indoor Soccer League (1978–1992) commentators
Major League Baseball broadcasters
Major League Baseball public address announcers
Michigan State University alumni
Minnesota North Stars announcers
Minnesota Twins announcers
Minnesota Wild announcers
Minor League Baseball broadcasters
National Hockey League broadcasters
Year of birth missing (living people)